Chet Atkins Goes to the Movies is the forty-seventh studio album by guitarist Chet Atkins, released in 1975.

Chet won the 1976 Best Country Instrumental Performance Grammy for "The Entertainer". He and Jerry Reed were also nominated that year for their performance of "Colonel Bogey".

Track listing

Side one
 "Paramount on Parade" (Janis, King) – 0:19
 "My Own True Love" – 3:00
 "Everybody's Talkin'" (Fred Neil) – 2:56
 "Terry Theme from Limelight" (Chaplin) – 2:50
 "Emily" (Johnny Mandel, Johnny Mercer) – 2:28
 "Charade" (Henry Mancini, Johnny Mercer) – 3:46
 "Paramount on Parade" (Janis, King) – 2:25

Side two
 "Solace" (Scott Joplin) – 2:49
 "The Entertainer" (Scott Joplin) – 2:17
 "Over the Rainbow" (Harold Arlen, E.Y. Harburg) – 2:55
 "Somewhere, My Love" (Maurice Jarre, Paul Francis Webster) – 2:33
 "A Man and a Woman" – 2:41
 "Merrily We Roll Along" – 0:26

Personnel
Chet Atkins - guitar, banjo, violin, viola
Paul Yandell – guitar, high-strung guitar
Boyce Hawkins – organ
Larrie Londin – drums
John Christopher – guitar
Terry McMillan – harmonica
Bobby Wood – piano
Beegie Cruser – piano
Mike Leach – bass
Tommy Cogbill – drums
Billy Sanford – guitar
Hayward Bishop – drums
Ray Stevens – ARP
Production notes
Produced by Chet Atkins, Bob Ferguson
Chuck Seitz – engineer
Bubba Campbell – recording technician
Roy Shockley – recording technician
Ray Butts – recording technician
John Knowles – arranger ("A Man and a Woman", "Merrily We Roll Along", "Solace", "The Entertainer")
Lenny Breau – arranger ("Emily")

Chet Atkins albums
1976 albums
Albums produced by Chet Atkins
Albums produced by Bob Ferguson (music)
RCA Records albums